Blood and Vomit is the debut album by Norwegian black metal artist Nattefrost.

Track listing
 "Ancient Devil Worshipping" - 4:00
 "Sluts of Hell" - 3:07
 "Satanic Victory" - 1:02
 "Universal Funeral" - 2:41
 "The Art of Spiritual Purification" - 5:56
 "Sanctum 666" - 4:10
 "Whore (Filthy Whore)" - 4:47
 "Mass Destruction" - 3:03
 "Nattefrost Takes a Piss" - 0:26
 "The Gate of Nanna (Beherit cover)" - 4:42
 "Still Reaching for Hell" - 6:01

Credits
Roger Nattefrost - all instruments

2004 albums
Nattefrost albums
Season of Mist albums